St-Laurent is a station on the Confederation Line of Ottawa's O-Train, located at St. Laurent Boulevard and the Queensway.

Location

The station is integrated to its surroundings, with direct indoor pedestrian access to the St. Laurent Shopping Centre. It serves as a major hub for local east end bus routes and has a ticket sales and information office. In addition to serving the shopping centre, it serves numerous commercial and industrial areas in the area and is a major transfer point for east-end commuters, making it one of the busiest stations. An office building occupied in part by ING is also 200 metres west of the station.

History
Originally built as a Transitway station, its construction required the complete reconstruction of the St. Laurent Boulevard / Highway 417 interchange and the construction of a tunnel to allow the transitway to cross underneath the Queensway. Its construction was linked to the last major expansion of the shopping centre in 1987.

On June 28, 2015, the main Transitway platforms closed for Confederation Line construction. The station reopened on September 14, 2019, when Confederation Line service began.

Layout
 The rail station has two side platforms and is the only underground station on the Confederation Line outside the downtown section between Lyon and Rideau stations. Ticket barriers are located on the platform level, preventing crossover between the platforms within the fare-paid zone. 

Above the platform level, a concourse level provides access to the shopping centre. At ground level, a local bus terminus has been retained from the original Transitway station. 

The station's artwork consists of an untitled series of large murals by Andrew Morrow, depicting moments in Canadian history.

Service

OC Transpo

The following routes serve St-Laurent station as of May 20, 2021: Route 12 is temporarily truncated west of St. Laurent Boulevard due to the Montreal Road revitalization project.

Megabus 
Starting May 20, 2021, Megabus is operating an intercity bus routes between Ottawa's St-Laurent station, Kingston, Scarborough, and Toronto four days a week, between Thursday and Sunday. This is after Greyhound Canada ceased operations from Ottawa Central Station in October 2020 and shut down all bus service permanently on May 13, 2021.

Rider Express 
Rider Express offers a Toronto-Kingston-Ottawa service departing from St-Laurent station.

References

External links

Confederation Line stations
Railway stations located underground in Canada
1987 establishments in Ontario
2019 establishments in Ontario
Railway stations in Canada opened in 2019